Jessica Toihi McFadyen (born 5 October 1991) is a New Zealand cricketer who plays as a wicket-keeper for the Wellington Blaze. In November 2020, in the second round of the 2020–21 Hallyburton Johnstone Shield tournament, McFadyen scored 107 runs. She finished the tournament as the leading run-scorer for Wellington, with 397 runs in ten matches.

In May 2021, McFadyen was offered her first contract with the New Zealand women's cricket team. In August 2021, McFadyen earned her maiden call-up to the New Zealand women's cricket team, for their tour of England.

In June 2022, McFadyen was named in New Zealand's team for the cricket tournament at the 2022 Commonwealth Games in Birmingham, England. She made her Twenty20 International debut on 2 December 2022, against Bangladesh, but fell ill during the game and did not bat or keep wicket. She made her One Day International debut on 11 December 2022, also against Bangladesh, taking one catch and making one stumping.

References

External links

1991 births
Living people
Cricketers from Wellington City
New Zealand women cricketers
New Zealand women One Day International cricketers
New Zealand women Twenty20 International cricketers
Wellington Blaze cricketers
Cricketers at the 2022 Commonwealth Games
Commonwealth Games bronze medallists for New Zealand
Commonwealth Games medallists in cricket
Medallists at the 2022 Commonwealth Games